Orchelimum pulchellum, the handsome meadow katydid, is a species of meadow katydid in the family Tettigoniidae. It is found in North America.

Description
This katydid is distinguished from Orchelimum nigripes, its western relative, by the shape of the caudal portion of its lateral pronotum, which is arcuate inferior to the humeral sinus in O. pulchellum, while the same portion is sinuate or sub-sinuate in O. nigripes. The medial tooth on each of the paired male cerci in O. pulchellum  is positioned at a less acute angle to the sinuate sinus of the cercus in O. pulchellum when compared to that of O. nigripes. In females, the ovipositor is long and sickle shaped. The tibiae are brown in O. pulchellum, while they are typically black in O. nigripes. O. pulchellum has no spines on the inner carinae of the hind femora, which distinguishes it from another relative, O. carinatum. It is distinguished from its Texas relative, O. bullatum, by virtue of its narrower fastigium and by having spines on the outer ventral carinae of the hind femora, generally numbering at least six total when both sides are counted. O. pulchellum commonly has blue compound eyes, a trait it shares with O. erythrocephalum, on its white or yellow face. At rest, its folded wings appear to have a turquoise stripe, while the body is green with reddish marks around the head.

The song of the handsome meadow katydid is very similar to that of Orchelimum nigripes.  It consists of a series of paired and occasional single clicks leading into a short buzz.

Distribution
The handsome meadow katydid is found east of the Appalachian Mountains, as far north as New York state.  Its range extends south to Florida and west to Mississippi.

Ecology
This katydid is found in moist forests and in wetlands.  It consumes pollen from flowering plants and foliage.  In Alabama, it is active from mid-July until mid-November.

Evolution
According to Shapiro (1998), zones of hybridization have been established by O. pulchellum and O. nigripes in Mississippi and in the vicinity of the Potomac River, below the fall line and centered at the confluence of the Anacostia River with the Potomac.

Notes

References

External links

 

pulchellum
Articles created by Qbugbot
Insects described in 1909